Krassimira Banova (born 5 October 1960) is a former Bulgarian female basketball player. After her playing career she started working as coach. She currently serves as a referee for the Bulgarian Basketball Federation. Banova is part of most successful generation Bulgarian players in the 100 years history of this sport in the country. Her daughter Jaklin Zlatanova is also a basketball player. Krassimira Banova was born in 1960 in Dimitrovgrad, Bulgaria located in the Thrace region, close to the provincial capital, Haskovo where she spent most of her childhood. Her family moved to the capital Sofia, where she started practicing different sports. For some years she was training athletics, but eventually, in 1978, Banova found herself on the basketball court. She started with the basketball relatively late: at the age of 16 but was able to catch up quickly.

Club career

Women Basketball XXVI European Champions Cup 1984 

In 1984 BC Levski Sofia faced the Zulu Vicenza at the final of the Women European Champions Cup. According to most of the specialists back then, the Italian team was an absolute favorite, led by players like Beverly Smith, Catarina Polini, and Wanda Sandon.

National team career 

Krassimira Banova played for the Bulgarian national team for nearly a decade(1980-1990). She made her debut in 1980 during the Eurobasket Women. Banova participated in four Eurobasket Women tournament, two World Championships, and one Olympic Qualification.
 4th EuroBasket Women 1980
  EuroBasket Women 1983
  EuroBasket Women 1985
 7th 1986 FIBA World Championship for Women
 9th EuroBasket Women 1987
 8th 1990 FIBA World Championship for Women

Eurobasket Women 1983
The XIX European Basketball Championship for women took place in 1983 in Hungary. Between the 11th and 18 September, 12 European teams competed for the title. The games were played in three cities:  Miskolc, Zalaegerszeg, and Budapest.

Bulgaria competed in group B, with Czechoslovakia, Soviet Union, Germany, Italy, Sweden, and Yugoslavia. Banova played six games in total, ending up with an average of 9 points per game, and 75% of free throws made. In the match against Sweden, she finished with a record of 32 points. The Bulgarian team finished second in its group, stepping back only to the favorite for the title - Soviet Union.

On the semi-finals, Bulgaria won against Yugoslavia and qualified for the final against the Soviet Union. In the end, the Soviet Union finished first in the tournament, and Bulgaria grabs the silver medal. The bronze was for Hungary.

World Olympic Qualification Tournament for Women 1984 

The World Qualification Tournament for the 1984 Olympic Games was scheduled for May 1984 in Cuba. 19 teams competed for the place on the final, which opens the door for the games in Los Angeles. Bulgarian team was in group B, along with China, Japan, Czechoslovakia, and Zair.

The Bulgarian squad played 4 games: won against Zair and Japan and lost against China and Czechoslovakia. Krassimira Banova took part in 3 games, finishing the tournament with an average of 9 points and 75% of free throws.

EuroBasket Women 1985 

The XX Eurobasket for women was held from 8 to 15 Sep. 1985, in Italy. A total number of 12 teams participated in the tournament. The draw put Bulgaria in a group with Netherlands, Yugoslavia, Czechoslovakia,  France, Romania, and Hungary.

Krassimira Banova played in 7 games and finished the tournament as a team leader with an average of 17,4 points per game and 74,1% free throws. In the final match against the Soviet Union, she scored 27 points, but it wasn't enough for the title.

World Championship for Women 1986 

The 1986 World Championship for Women took place between the 8th and 17 August in the Soviet Union. Twelve teams divided into two groups participated in the tournament. Bulgaria was in group A with Soviet Union, Canada, Cuba, Korea, and Brasil. After 3 losses and two wins, the Bulgarian team finished in 7th place. Krassimira Banova played in 7 games and achieved, on average, 12,9Pts and 82,9% FT.

EuroBasket Women 1987 

The Eurobasket Women 1987 (4 - 11 September, Spain) opposed the continent's 12 best teams. The draw put Bulgaria in a group with Czechoslovakia, Yugoslavia, Italy, Spain, Finland, Romania, and Poland.

Banova couldn't help her team much. Bulgaria recorded three losses and two wins and ranked in 6th place. She participated in all games and finished the tournament with, on average, 15,7pts and 86,5%FT.

1990 World Championship for Women 

The Eurobasket Women 1987 (4 - 11 September, Spain) opposed the continent's 12 best teams. The draw put Bulgaria in a group with Czechoslovakia, Yugoslavia, Italy, Spain, Finland, Romania, and Poland.

Banova couldn't help her team much. Bulgaria recorded three losses and two wins and ranked in 6th place. She participated in all games and finished the tournament with, on average, 15,7pts and 86,5%FT.

References

External links
Красимира Банова at bgbasket.com(in Bulgarian)
European Basketball Championship Results: Since 1935 at books.google.de
Krasimira Banova at balkanleague.net
Referee profile
Krasimira Banova  at http://bubabasket.com
Women Basketball European Championships Archive 
EuroLeague Archive 
The European Basketball Database 

Bulgarian women's basketball players
Tarbes Gespe Bigorre players
People from Dimitrovgrad, Bulgaria
1960 births
Living people
Bulgarian basketball coaches
Basketball referees
Sportspeople from Haskovo Province
Women basketball referees